Kolonodale is a town and the administrative centre of the North Morowali Regency, in Central Sulawesi Province of Indonesia. It is also the administrative centre of Petasia District, one of the districts within the regency, with a total district population of 17,997 inhabitants at the 2020 Census.

Kolonodale was originally the administrative capital of Morowali Regency. In 2004, the plan to shift the Morowali capital southeast from Kolonodale to Bungku left non-Bungku residents, both Protestant and Muslim, feeling further disenfranchised. On 12 April 2013, a new North Morowali Regency was established, partitioned from the Morowali Regency, with Kolonodale as its principal town.

Climate
Kolonodale has a tropical rainforest climate (Af) with heavy to very heavy rainfall year-round.

References

Populated places in Central Sulawesi
Regency seats of Central Sulawesi